Remix Collection is a remixed collection of Kai Tracid's works from Skywalker 1999 (1999), Trance & Acid (2002) and Contemplate (the reason you exist) (2003) released on 13 December 2012.

Track listing

2012 remix albums
Kai Tracid albums
2012 albums